Jefferson Township is the name of some places in the U.S. state of Pennsylvania:

Jefferson Township, Berks County, Pennsylvania
Jefferson Township, Butler County, Pennsylvania
Jefferson Township, Dauphin County, Pennsylvania
Jefferson Township, Fayette County, Pennsylvania
Jefferson Township, Greene County, Pennsylvania
Jefferson Township, Lackawanna County, Pennsylvania
Jefferson Township, Mercer County, Pennsylvania
Jefferson Township, Somerset County, Pennsylvania
Jefferson Township, Washington County, Pennsylvania

Pennsylvania township disambiguation pages